GWR No. 1334, and sister locomotives 1335 and 1336, were  steam locomotives which the Great Western Railway inherited from the Midland and South Western Junction Railway.

History
The locomotives had been numbered 10, 11 and 12 by the M&SWJR. 
They were re-boilered by the GWR and they were the only M&SWJR locomotives to survive into British Railways ownership in 1948.

Withdrawal
The locomotives were withdrawn as follows. None is preserved.

Modelling
A 4 mm scale kit is available from Nu-Cast

References

External links
 GWR 1336 at Andover in 1953

1334
Dübs locomotives
2-4-0 locomotives